Nicholas T. Fernicola (August 8, 1903 – February 7, 1982) was an American Democratic Party politician who served as a New Jersey State senator.  He was a Criminal Court Judge for the City of Newark from 1948 to 1959, and was appointed Essex County Counsel in 1959.  He was elected to the New Jersey State Senate in 1965.  During his two years in the Senate, Fernicola played a role in raising the state contribution to junior colleges from $200 per student to $600.  He was an unsuccessful candidate for re-election to a second term in 1967.  He was the liaison officer between the Newark City Council and the New Jersey Legislature from 1972 to 1975.  In 1977, Fernicola ran for State Senator as an Independent against incumbent Martin L. Greenberg and received 2.6% of the vote.

1965 Essex County State Senator General Election results

References 

Democratic Party New Jersey state senators
New Jersey state court judges
Politicians from Newark, New Jersey
1903 births
1982 deaths
20th-century American judges
Lawyers from Newark, New Jersey
20th-century American politicians
20th-century American lawyers